Dorticos or Dorticós is a surname. Notable people with the surname include:

Osvaldo Dorticós Torrado (1919–1983), Cuban politician 
Yuniel Dorticos (born 1986), Cuban boxer